Mine Hill is a hill in Rockingham County, New Hampshire.

See also 
Massabesic Lake
Auburn, New Hampshire

Landforms of Rockingham County, New Hampshire
Auburn, New Hampshire